Víctor Agustín Ugarte Oviedo (5 May 1926 – 20 March 1995) was a Bolivian footballer. He scored 16 goals in 45 caps for Bolivia, making him their third all-time top goalscorer behind Joaquín Botero and Marcelo Moreno. His national team career lasted from 1947 to 1963, and he played for the Bolivian team that won the 1963 Copa América, where he scored two goals in Bolivia's final match of the tournament against Brazil.

Ugarte spent most of his career with Club Bolívar but he had a short spell with Argentine club San Lorenzo in 1958 where he was the first Bolivian to play in the Argentine Primera. He also played for Once Caldas in Colombia.

Ugarte retired from football in 1966.  In his last years he suffered from poverty and illness, which contributed to his death on March 20, 1995, aged 68. The Victor Agustín Ugarte stadium in Potosí is named in his honour.

International goals

References

External links
International statistics at rsssf
Tupiza Bolivia biography 

1926 births
1995 deaths
People from Sud Chichas Province
Bolivian footballers
Bolivia international footballers
Bolivian expatriate footballers
Club Bolívar players
San Lorenzo de Almagro footballers
Expatriate footballers in Argentina
Expatriate footballers in Colombia
Bolivian expatriate sportspeople in Argentina
Bolivian expatriate sportspeople in Colombia
Argentine Primera División players
Categoría Primera A players
Once Caldas footballers
1950 FIFA World Cup players
Copa América-winning players
Association football forwards